The Guerreran horned lizard (Phrynosoma sherbrookei) is a horned lizard species native to Mexico.

References

Phrynosoma
Reptiles of Mexico
Reptiles described in 2014
Taxa named by Leonhard Stejneger